The paracercomonads are a group of cercozoan protists. Taxonomically, they comprise the family Paracercomonadidae, order Paracercomonadida and subclass Paracercomonada. Due to their morphological similarities to the cercomonads, members of this family were grouped with Cercomonas and similar taxa from the beginning. However, their similarities are due to convergent evolution.

Classification
There are currently 5 genera of paracercomonads:
Brevimastigomonas 
Metabolomonas 
Nucleocercomonas 
Paracercomonas 
Phytocercomonas

References

Cercozoa families